UVic, or the University of Victoria is a university in Greater Victoria British Columbia, Canada.

UVic may also refer to:

 Uvic acid, more commonly known as tartaric acid
 150145 Uvic, an asteroid named after the University of Victoria
 University of Vic - Central University of Catalonia, a university in Osona, Spain

See also
Victoria University (disambiguation), for other educational institutions with Victoria and  University in their name